Jordan competed at the 2008 Summer Paralympics in Beijing, China. Jordanian athletes competed in three sports: athletics, powerlifting and table tennis. Among the competitors was Maha Barghouti, a table tennis player who won Jordan's first Paralympic gold medal at the 2000 Summer Paralympics. The team left for Beijing on September 29.

Medalists

Sports

Athletics

Men's field

Women's field

Powerlifting

Men

Women

Table tennis

See also
Jordan at the Paralympics
Jordan at the 2008 Summer Olympics

References

Nations at the 2008 Summer Paralympics
2008
Paralympics